The St. Louis Brown Stockings joined the newly formed National League as a charter member in 1876. Although both St. Louis and Hartford finished the season 6 games behind the pennant-winning Chicago White Stockings, the Brown Stockings were officially the third place team as, in 1877, the standings were determined by number of wins, not games behind. As Hartford had 47 wins and St. Louis only had 45, Hartford finished in second and St. Louis finished in third.  Nonetheless, St. Louis had won its season series against Chicago 6 games to 4 – winning all of its season series against all National League opponents. Due to the politics between the teams at the time, an unofficial five-game post-season was created between those two teams to determine the "Championship of the West."  St. Louis won the series 4 games to 1. According to Stathead, the 1876 Brown Stockings hold the lowest team ERA in MLB history (1.22).

Regular season

Season standings

Record vs. opponents

Roster

Player stats

Batting

Starters by position
Note: Pos = Position; G = Games played; AB = At bats; H = Hits; Avg. = Batting average; HR = Home runs; RBI = Runs batted in

Other batters
Note: G = Games played; AB = At bats; H = Hits; Avg. = Batting average; HR = Home runs; RBI = Runs batted in

Pitching

Starting pitchers
Note: G = Games pitched; IP = Innings pitched; W = Wins; L = Losses; ERA = Earned run average; SO = Strikeouts

Relief pitchers
Note: G = Games pitched; W = Wins; L = Losses; SV = Saves; ERA = Earned run average; SO = Strikeouts

References
1876 St. Louis Brown Stockings season at Baseball Reference

St. Louis Brown Stockings seasons
Saint Louis Brown Stockings season
St. Louis Brown Stockings